Mario Ortíz (14 October 1953 – 11 September 1978) was an Argentine boxer. He competed in the men's featherweight event at the 1972 Summer Olympics.

References

External links
 

1953 births
1978 deaths
Argentine male boxers
Olympic boxers of Argentina
Boxers at the 1972 Summer Olympics
Sportspeople from Mendoza Province
Featherweight boxers